Heeling may refer to:

 Heeling (sailing)
 A behavior in herding dogs
 A dog obedience training task
 A dog obedience trial exercise
 Part of a team roping rodeo event

See also
 Heel (disambiguation)
 Healing